Gary M. Kusin (born 1951) is an American entrepreneur best known as the founder of GameStop.

Biography
In 1984, Kusin co-founded video game retailer Babbage's, which is now known as GameStop. In February 1995, one year after Babbage's merger with Software etc., Kusin resigned as President of the company. Following his resignation, Kusin, alongside Janet Gurwitch,  founded cosmetics company Kusin Gurwitch Cosmetics. He also served as CEO and President of FedEx Kinko's from 2001 to 2006. Kusin has been serving on the board of Electronic Arts since 1995, and on the board of Radio Shack from 2004 to 2005. Gary's sons Ben and Eric are also entrepreneurs. The two appeared on season 6 of ABC's Shark Tank for their company Reviver Clothing Wipes.

References

American chief executives
Living people
1951 births
Harvard Business School alumni
University of Texas at Austin alumni
GameStop people